Grimsley is an unincorporated community and census-designated place (CDP) in Fentress County, Tennessee, United States. Its population was 1,167 as of the 2010 census. Its ZIP code is 38565.

Geography
The community is located in southern Fentress County on the Cumberland Plateau. Both rivers are part of the Cumberland River watershed.

U.S. Route 127 is the main road through the community, leading north  to Jamestown, the Fentress County seat, and south  to Clarkrange. Tennessee State Route 85 forms the southwestern edge of the CDP, dropping by switchbacks into the gorge of the East Fork of the Obey and leading  to Livingston.

Demographics

2020 census

As of the 2020 United States census, there were 1,219 people, 357 households, and 252 families residing in the CDP.

References

Census-designated places in Tennessee
Census-designated places in Fentress County, Tennessee
Unincorporated communities in Tennessee
Unincorporated communities in Fentress County, Tennessee